Donatella Agostinelli (born 3 April 1974 in Jesi) is an Italian politician of the Five Star Movement and member of the XVII Legislature of the Italian Republic serving on the Justice Commission.

Early life
Agostinelli was born on 3 April 1974 in Jesi, Province of Ancona in the Marche region of Italy. She graduated with a law degree from the University of Camerino.

Career
As a member of the Five Star Movement (M5S), Agostinelli won the 2013 Italian general election from Marche and became a member of the Italian Chamber of Deputies. She serves on the Justice Commission of the Chamber and was a member of parliamentary committee set up to investigate the death of an armed personnel. Agostinelli is the vice-chair of Vallesina Health and Environment Committee. She protested against the conversion of a sugar plant to bio-diesel refinery and voiced her concern against the high expenses of regional governing bodies. She has also participated in a hearing on transport Commission held in the Chamber of Deputies. Following the January 2017 Central Italy earthquakes, she questioned the slow response shown by the bureaucracy in relief work.

Personal life
Agostinelli lives in the municipality of Apiro.

References

1974 births
Living people
People from Iesi
Five Star Movement politicians
Deputies of Legislature XVII of Italy
Senators of Legislature XVIII of Italy
Politicians of Marche
University of Camerino alumni
21st-century Italian women politicians
20th-century Italian women
Women members of the Chamber of Deputies (Italy)
Women members of the Senate of the Republic (Italy)